Richard Durock (January 18, 1937 – September 17, 2009) was an American actor and stuntman who appeared in over eighty films and over seven hundred television episodes. He played Swamp Thing in both the feature films Swamp Thing and The Return of Swamp Thing and the subsequent television show. He stood an imposing 6'6".

Biography 
Durock played a Hulk-like creature on the television series The Incredible Hulk, two-part episode titled "The First", in which it was revealed that David Banner was not the first man to become such a creature; another scientist accidentally created one some thirty years before, also while seeking a way to use radiation to increase strength. Durock also appeared in the Clint Eastwood films The Enforcer (1976) and Any Which Way You Can (1980) as well as Doc Savage: The Man of Bronze (1975), and Falcon Crest in 1983 in the second-season finale as a henchman for The Cartel.  Durock also made a brief yet memorable appearance in Rob Reiner's film Stand by Me as a county fair pie-eating champion.

Personal life 
Durock was born in South Bend, Indiana, to Serbian mother Sadie (Medich) and David Durock. He resided in Southern California and appeared at fan conventions.

Death 
Durock died of pancreatic cancer at his home in Oak Park, California on September 17, 2009. He was a veteran of the United States Marine Corps.

Filmography

References

External links
 
 
 

1937 births
2009 deaths
Deaths from pancreatic cancer
Deaths from cancer in California
American male film actors
American stunt performers
American male television actors
United States Marines
People from South Bend, Indiana
People from Oak Park, California
American people of Serbian descent
20th-century American male actors
Male actors from Indiana